McKane v. Durston, 153 U.S. 684 (1894), was a United States Supreme Court case in which the Court held that the appellant, John McKane, had no federal constitutional right to an appeal.  They held that state courts had the right to grant appellate review at their discretion.

Background 
According to the opinion, which provides a short history, John McKane was charged and convicted of violating "certain provisions of the law ... relating to elections and to the registration of voters."  He was sentenced to six years of hard labor at Sing Sing prison, on February 19, 1894.  The lawyer representing McKane then filed a petition for the writ of habeas corpus in the circuit court of the United States for the southern district of New York.  The circuit court denied the appeal, so the Supreme Court asserted jurisdiction, citing that constitutional questions of the validity of the incarceration were present.  McKane also asked for bail while his appeal was ongoing.

Opinion of the Court

The opinion, delivered by Justice Harlan, dismissed the claim of due process under the Fifth Amendment since this amendment's due process requirement did not apply to the states.  Harlan noted that this claim was probably an accident of the attorney who prepared the petition.  He noted that the due process requirement of the Fourteenth Amendment was also not violated, since this is the due process that applies to the states.

Code Cr. Proc. N. Y. § 555 stated that the trial court to which the habeas corpus petition was presented may rule in favor of granting him bail while the appeal was proceeding, and the opinion mentions that this means that the initial trial court had discretion to grant or deny bail.  Since the circuit court denied bail, the opinion stated this was consistent with New York law, so that decision was not before the court to review.

The Court concluded by affirming the judgment of the circuit court which denied the habeas corpus petition.

References

External links
 

1894 in United States case law
Electoral fraud in the United States
United States criminal due process case law
United States Supreme Court cases
United States Supreme Court cases of the Fuller Court